Any Day Now is  a 2012 American drama film directed by Travis Fine, who rewrote the original screenplay that George Arthur Bloom had written 30 years previously. Alan Cumming and Garret Dillahunt star as a gay couple who assume guardianship of a teenage boy who has Down syndrome, only to find themselves at odds with the biological mother and California's family law courts.

The film premiered at the 2012 Tribeca Film Festival, where Music Box Films acquired distribution. It received a limited theatrical release on December 14, 2012, to positive reviews.

Plot
Rudy Donatello (Alan Cumming) is a struggling musician and drag performer in a gay nightclub "Fabios" in 1979 West Hollywood, where he meets Paul Fleiger (Garret Dillahunt), a closeted district attorney. Returning home to his apartment, Rudy sees that his junkie neighbour Marianna (Jamie Anne Allman) has left her son Marco (Isaac Leyva) home alone, a thirteen year-old who has down syndrome. The next morning, following a dispute with landlord Mr Blum (Louis Lombardi), Rudy discovers Marianna has not returned. Fearing that Marco will be mistreated if placed into foster care, he takes Marco to Paul's workplace for advice on what to do. Anxious over their sudden appearance, Paul tells him to contact Family Services and asks Rudy not to appear there again. Paul's colleagues begin to suspect he is a homosexual whilst a frustrated Rudy accuses him of neglecting Marco. As they return home, brute family services officer Miss Martinez (Kamala Lopez) arrives and abruptly moves Marco into a foster home. He however struggles to settle in and escapes during the night. 

Paul re-visits Fabios and makes amends with Rudy. On their way home, they see Marco wandering the streets in search of his home and subsequently decide to house him for the night. The following morning, Rudy bonds with Marco before Blum appears at the door harassing him for rent. Fearing he will report them to family services, Rudy enlists Paul to help him gain custody. The two visit Marianna in prison and promise her they will take good care of him if she allows. Though Marianna doesn't believe Paul's insinuation that they are just "friends" and not in a relationship, she signs the temporary guardianship papers and Paul and Rudy become Marco's guardians. Upon the three moving in together, Marco tells them he is elated with his new "home." Upon a medical checkup, Paul and Rudy are advised that Marco has not been well cared for and his disability may see them undertake parenting for the rest of his life. Undeterred, over one year they improve his overall health and diet, enlist him into special education, and subsequently see his social and intellectual skills flourish. During periods of vacations, celebrating Halloween, Christmas and his fourteenth birthday, he now lovingly refers to Paul and Rudy as his "two daddies." Paul is also promoted at the district attorney's office, whilst he and Marco support Rudy with his desire to become a professional singer.

Wishing to know more about Paul following his promotion, D.A. Wilson (Chris Mulkey) invites the trio to a party at his home. Rudy however becomes angered when Paul refers to him as his "cousin" who "has a child." Paul's secretary Monica (Miracle Laurie), noticing Wilson's suspicion of Paul and Rudy's intimacy, pretends to flirt with him whilst Rudy suspects Paul has no intention of revealing to anyone that he is his lover. Paul privately confesses to Rudy that he suspects Wilson is homophobic and will cause them issues with custody of Marco is he suspects they are a couple. Wilson sees them arguing and fires Monica and Paul the following day, whilst also reporting the inaccuracies on their custody forms to the court. Family services abruptly remove Marco from their care as Rudy, overwrought at the decision, is arrested whilst attempting to keep Marco from leaving. An enraged Paul negotiates Rudy's bail and convinces him to quit working as a drag performer in the hope of the court over-turning the decision and him continuing to practice law. The duo are condemned by Judge Meyerson (Frances Fisher) for hiding the true nature of their relationship at the time of signing custodial papers, however allows them to apply for sole custody pending an investigation into their time with Marco and his proposed living environment. 

The district attorney's office shamelessly launch several accusations of paedophilia and dispute same-sex adoption, despite Marco informing the court's representative Miss Mills (Mindy Sterling) that such never happened and of his sole desire to live with them. Paul and Rudy refute the accusations and insist Marco has shown them both the real joy of what it means to be a parent and will raise him to be a good man. After having their home (Marco's living environment) positively evaluated, it appears they are set to receive custody, leading Rudy to contact him and insist he will be "home" shortly. Marco, delighted, prepares to leave and waits anxiously for them, however in a last minute reversal Judge Meyerson decides against returning him to their care, stating that the duo kissing in front of him and having Marco visit Fabios, despite only attending when closed and Rudy never dress-rehearsing in front of him, as inappropriate situations. Marco, distraught at not returning to his home, is soon moved into a state run foster center for children who have disabilities. Refusing to give up on their fight for custody, Paul seeks the help of lawyer Lonnie Washington (Don Franklin) to help over-turn the decision. A new judge, Richard Resnick (Alan Rachins), agrees to review the case and approves them to visit Marco only once before the hearing. Paul and Rudy are saddened to see that he has lost weight, not communicating as well as he used to and is possibly suffering from depression. Following Washington's adamance that he has developed a strong case that Fisher's ruling was not in the best interests of the child, potentially unlawful and merely homophobic, he is confident that they will soon be awarded full custody of Marco. The case is however immediately dismissed following Marianna, now out of prison, appearing in person to apply for reunification with Marco under legal guidance from the district attorney's office. Despite Marianna's clear hesitation, and Rudy emphatically alleging that she has most likely been persuaded or bribed by Wilson to take Marco back, has not contacted Marco for over a year and disputes how long she has been out for, she receives custody. Washington tells a mellowed Paul and Rudy that there is no way in "this day and age" that a mother would lose custody of her child to them and that any further attempts to gain custody were unlikely be heard in court. He advises them to wait until Marco is older and free from his mother's control before they can hope he will come and find them. 

Marco is valeted to what he is told is his "home." Upon arriving at his mother's new apartment, he is repeatedly ignored as he tells the valets "this is not my home." Marianna immediately uses drugs and has sex directly in front of Marco, whilst her boyfriend verbally abuses him. She tells him to wait outside the apartment until she calls him back in. Unhappy with his new living environment, Marco begins to wander the streets in search of Paul and Rudy. Some time later, Paul writes several letters to the judges and D.A Wilson, attaching a small newspaper article informing that Marco died under a bridge after three days of wandering, failing to find his way "home." Both devastated by his death, Paul watches Rudy sing "I Shall Be Released" in tribute to Marco.

Cast
 Alan Cumming as Rudy Donatello
 Garret Dillahunt as Paul Fliger
 Gregg Henry as Lambert
 Jamie Anne Allman as Marianna DeLeon
 Chris Mulkey as D.A. Wilson
 Don Franklin as Lonnie Washington
 Kelli Williams as Miss Flemming
 Alan Rachins as Judge Richard Resnick
 Frances Fisher as Judge Meyerson
 Isaac Leyva as Marco DeLeon
 Mindy Sterling as Miss Mills
 Miracle Laurie as Monica
 Michael Nouri as Miles Dubrow
 Jeffrey Pierce as Officer Plitt
 Anne O'Shea as Mrs. Lowell
 Randy Roberts as P.J.
 Louis Lombardi as Mr. Blum
 Joe Howard as Dr. Watkins
 Randy Thompson as Coco
 Ezra Buzzington as Larry
 Clyde Kusatsu as Dr. Nakahura
 Kamala Lopez as Miss Martinez

History
Bloom describes the story behind getting the film made:
"The screenplay for Any Day Now was inspired by a true story – not based on a true story. I wrote the original script 30 years ago. A friend of mine in NY introduced me to a gay man named Rudy. Rudy lived on Atlantic Ave in Brooklyn. At that time, Atlantic Ave was pretty rundown. It has been gentrified since then. Rudy lived in a tiny apartment and had very little money. He befriended a 12-year-old boy who lived a few blocks away. The boy had been abandoned by his druggie/prostitute mother, and lived with his grandmother. The grandmother didn't do much to provide for the boy, who didn't speak. I'm guessing he was autistic, but there was no money to do anything about it. Rudy would bring the boy to his apartment, see to it that he was properly clothed and fed, and he did what he could to get him into school. He practically raised him. That is where reality ended and my writer's imagination took over. After spending time with Rudy and the boy, I got to wondering what would happen if Rudy decided to adopt him. I did my research and spoke to a number of people about the problems a gay man would have adopting a boy. Remember, this was 1980. The times were a lot different then, although we still have a long way to go. Several months later I had a screenplay."

Despite having a compelling story, Bloom would have to wait 32 years to actually see the film made. He explains:
"My son, PJ, is one of the top Music Supervisors in LA, as well as a record producer and publisher. Among other shows, PJ is the Music Supervisor on Glee. Travis Fine, the director of Any Day Now, made another independent movie 3 years ago called The Space Between. Travis and PJ were friends in high school. When Travis needed help with the music on his movie he contacted PJ. When the movie was done, Travis told PJ he was looking for another movie to do, something small, with heart, and about something important. PJ, who has known about my script his entire adult life, told Travis the story. Travis loved it, and asked that I send him the screenplay. I did, and he said he wanted to make it, with the caveat that he could do some rewriting. We discussed that, and I agreed. Travis did his rewrite, raised the money, hired the actors, and made the movie. If you discount the first 30 years of trying to get the movie made, the last couple have gone by quickly. I love everything Travis did to the script, and he's made a marvelous movie. He changed the boy who didn't speak to a boy who has Down Syndrome, and cast an extraordinary actor with Down Syndrome to play the part. Travis made several other significant changes, but the heart and soul of my screenplay remain as the anchor to the movie."

Reception
Any Day Now received generally positive reviews, currently holding an 79% "certified fresh" rating on Rotten Tomatoes.

Awards
 Chicago International Film Festival 2012 - Audience Choice Award for Best Narrative Feature
 Seattle International Film Festival 2012 - Best Actor Award, Alan Cumming 
 Seattle International Film Festival 2012 - Best Film
 Tribeca Film Festival 2012 - Heineken Audience Award  
 Outfest 2012 - Audience Award - Outstanding Dramatic Feature Film
 Outfest 2012 - Outstanding Actor in a US Dramatic Feature Film, Alan Cumming
 Provincetown International Film Festival 2012 - Audience Award
 Woodstock Film Festival 2012 - Audience Award
GLAAD Media Award 2012 - Best Film in Limited Release

References

External links
 
 
 
 
 
 

2012 drama films
2012 LGBT-related films
2012 films
American drama films
American LGBT-related films
Down syndrome in film
2010s English-language films
LGBT-related films based on actual events
Films about adoption
Films set in 1979
Films set in 1980
American independent films
LGBT-related drama films
Gay-related films
American films based on actual events
Films about parenting
2010s American films